The Jatco 5R01, also called RE5R01A (Nissan part) or JR502E/JR503E (Jatco part), was a 5-speed automatic transmission from Jatco and Nissan Motors for use in rear wheel drive vehicles with longitudinal engines.

Applications
Nissan Cedric
Nissan Gloria
Nissan Cefiro
Nissan Skyline
Nissan Laurel
BMW 5 Series (E39) Japanese and South African models (only pre-facelift)
BMW 3 Series (E36) Japanese and South African models
BMW 5 Series (E34) Japanese and South African models

See also
List of Jatco Transmissions

5R01